A rescuer is a person who rescues something from harm or danger. They are trained in some combination of technical rescue, diver rescue, mountain rescue, extrication rescue, and advanced firefighting. The term is commonly used with people who are doing a rescue and in some careers use "Rescuer" as the job title.

The main job of a rescuer is to save lives in a dangerous environment.

Types

Fire department 

A rescuer in a fire department is very different between western and eastern cultures.
 North American departments have their rescuers mix within normal fire fighters. They share the same equipment and pointed as the leader during a rescue mission. Rescuers have classroom and field training with senior rescue members. Only time when a groups of rescuers are in teams are during water rescue, air rescue, mountain rescue, or a major disaster.
 Asian departments form special units of rescuers. These rescuers have their own equipment, apparatuses, or even their own fire stations. They would have served as a firefighter before they have training to be a rescuer. Training is like a recruit training and the trainees maybe asked to quit if their performance does not meet certain standards. After passing training they are sent to a Rescue Unit and given extra training within that unit.

Military
A rescuer in the military is a soldier or sailor who has extra training in diver rescue, mountain rescue, or in extrication. Commonly these rescuers are known from Coast Guard service, where they are seen saving people during a dangerous encounter. A normal military rescuer's duty is to save another military personnel during combat or normal operations.

See also
Rescue
Search and rescue
Rescue Diver

pl:Ratownik